Stump Family Farm is a national historic district located near Moorefield, Hardy County, West Virginia.  The district encompasses three contributing buildings and one contributing site.  It includes a cabin constructed of rough hewn white oak with a top log of pine, built about 1775.  Also on the property is a barn (c. 1810), well house (c. 1810), and the Stump family cemetery.  The property commemorates pre-revolutionary pioneer life in America. Michael Stump purchased the property about 1781 and it remained in the family until 1972.

The site was added to the National Register of Historic Places in 1998.

References

Farms on the National Register of Historic Places in West Virginia
Houses on the National Register of Historic Places in West Virginia
Historic districts in Hardy County, West Virginia
Houses in Hardy County, West Virginia
Houses completed in 1775
National Register of Historic Places in Hardy County, West Virginia
Historic districts on the National Register of Historic Places in West Virginia
Log buildings and structures on the National Register of Historic Places in West Virginia